Hakam Ali Khan (born 20 March 1966) is an Indian politician belonging to the Indian National Congress. He is currently the Chairman Of Waqf Development Council Rajasthan, also a Member of the Rajasthan Legislative Assembly from Fatehpur Assembly constituency. He was appointed as the General Secretary Of Rajasthan Pradesh Congress Committee in Jan 2021.

References

External links 

Living people
1966 births
Indian National Congress politicians from Rajasthan